Noorpur is a village and union council, an administrative subdivision, of Chakwal District in the Punjab Province of Pakistan, it is part of Chakwal Tehsil. It contains seven villages Sar Kalan, Matan, Sethi, Matan Kalan, Laphi, Noorpur and Bhall.

References

Union councils of Chakwal District
Populated places in Chakwal District
Villages in Kallar Kahar Tehsil